Kimberlee Acquaro is an American filmmaker and photojournalist. Acquaro 's work covers human and civil rights, racial and gender justice. She has been nominated for an Academy Award and won an Emmy for Best Documentary. She is a recipient of the Guggenheim Fellowship in Film and the Pew Fellowship in International Journalism, Otis College of Art and Design's LA Artist Residency and an Emerging Curator's Fellowship.

Her work has garnered international film festival awards and been featured on HBO, Cinemax, CNN, CBS, NPR, "The Tavis Smiley Show", "The Voice of America," BBC/PRI's "The World"; shown at The Museum of Modern Art in New York City, The Boston Museum of Fine Art, The California African American Museum, Harvard’s Carr Center for Human Rights, The Museum of Contemporary Art in Santa Barbara, The Museum of Tolerance in Los Angeles, The United States Holocaust Memorial Museum in Washington D.C., The Los Angeles LGBTQ Center, Advocate Gochis Gallery in Los Ángeles and the Robin Rice Gallery in New York City. Acquaro's  journalism has appeared as cover stories in The New York Times Magazine, in The Washington Post Magazine, Time Magazine, U.S. News & World Report, Interview, Mother Jones, Art News and many international publications. She was awarded a prestigious Pew Fellowship in International Journalism and a Residency at Johns Hopkins School of Advanced International Studies in Washington DC for her work in Rwanda. She received  a Guggenheim Fellowship in Film for her work documenting race in America through the eyes of African-Americans over the age of 100 in I'll Rise.
Acquaro's practice has expanded to include visual art as collective action, public space art and socially engaged exhibitions on racism, bias and transgender rights.

Acquaro began her career as an intern for photographer Mary Ellen Mark and assistant to Eddie Adams.  She worked as assistant to the director of photography at Life magazine then a photography editor at Time magazine and at U.S. News & World Report. She joined the staff at The Eddie Adams Workshop; has been a jurist at Visa Pour L'Image in Perpignan, France; a jurist for The International Documentary Association and for the Emmy Awards.  She studied photography and earned her MFA at Maine Media College. Acquaro's work is represented by Women Make Movies.

Awards
Emmy Award for Best Documentary
 International Reporting Project Fellow
 2001 Pew Fellowship in International Journalism
2010 Guggenheim Fellowship
SilverDocs Jury Award and Audience Award
Aspen ShortsFest Audience Award
Palm Springs ShortsFest Audience Award
Urban Vibe Film Festival - Best Documentary Short

Filmography
 100 Years (2010)
MissRepresentation
 God Sleeps in Rwanda (2005)

Works
"Out of Madness, A Matriarchy", Mother Jones, January/February 2003
"The Girls Next Door" Sex Slaves on Main Street The New York Times Magazine January 2004

References

External links
"Kimberlee Acquaro", Tavis Smiley, February 17, 2006
"Women of Rwanda Take Charge; A Day in the Life of President Ellen Johnson-Sirleaf", Inside Africa, CNN, October 14, 2006
Satya, June/July 2006
 Kimberlee Acquaro at Women Make Movies

American filmmakers
Living people
Year of birth missing (living people)